Emilio Samayoa (born 22 July 1964) is a Guatemalan sprinter. He competed in the men's 100 metres at the 1984 Summer Olympics.

References

1964 births
Living people
Athletes (track and field) at the 1984 Summer Olympics
Guatemalan male sprinters
Olympic athletes of Guatemala
Place of birth missing (living people)